The following is a list of artists and bands associated with the new wave music genre during the late 1970s and early-to-mid 1980s. The list does not include acts associated with the resurgences and revivals of the genre that have occurred from the 1990s onward. Acts associated with these revivals are found in the list of post-punk revival bands article.

Groups and artists with aliases are listed by the first letter in their name, and individuals are listed by their surname.

Note: ± indicates an inductee of the Rock and Roll Hall of Fame

0–9
The 77s

A

A-ha
ABC
Adam and the Ants
After the Fire
The Alarm
The Aliens
Alisa (early work)
Alphaville
Altered Images
Animotion
Adam Ant
Any Trouble
Joan Armatrading (1980s work)
Matthew Ashman
Associates
The Attractions
The Avant Gardeners
Azra
Aztec Camera

B

The B-52's
B-Movie
Baltimora
Bananarama
The Bangles
Toni Basil
Stiv Bators
The Beat (aka the English Beat)
Berlin
Big in Japan
Bijelo Dugme
±Blondie
Blotto
The Blow Monkeys
The Bluebells
Blue Peter
Blurt
Boa
Book of Love
The Boomtown Rats
Bow Wow Wow
Dale Bozzio
The Brains
Brygada Kryzys
The Buggles
Bulevar
Buzzcocks

C

±Belinda Carlisle
Joe Carrasco
±The Cars
Catholic Discipline
A Certain Ratio
Cetu Javu
The Chameleons
Chi-Pig
China Crisis
 ±The Clash
Climie Fisher
Clocks
Cock Robin
Lloyd Cole and the Commotions
Comateens
The Comsat Angels
±Alice Cooper (1980s work)
±Elvis Costello
Josie Cotton
Marshall Crenshaw
The Crocodiles
Cuddly Toys (Trial and Crosses era)
Culture Club
±The Cure
Cutting Crew

D

Étienne Daho
Dalek I Love You
The Danse Society
Dead or Alive
Delta 5
±Depeche Mode
Jimmy Destri
Devo
Dexys Midnight Runners
The Distractions
Divinyls
Thomas Dolby
Doll by Doll
The Doll
Dr. Feelgood
The Dream Academy
±Duran Duran
Ian Dury

E

Ebn Ozn
Echo & the Bunnymen
Edin-Ådahl
Električni Orgazam
Eurogliders
±Eurythmics
Everything but the Girl

F

Face to Face
Marianne Faithfull (Broken English era)
Fiat Lux
Film
Fingerprintz
Fischer-Z
The Fixx
Flash and the Pan
A Flock of Seagulls
The Flying Lizards
The Flys
Fra Lippo Lippi
Frankie Goes to Hollywood
Freur
Friends Again
Robert Fripp
Fun Boy Three

G

Gleaming Spires
±The Go-Go's
Vivien Goldman
Richard Gottehrer
Gruppo Sportivo

H

Nina Hagen
Haircut One Hundred
Haustor
Greg Hawkes
Vanessa Briscoe Hay
Bonnie Hayes
Robert Hazard
Heaven 17
Nona Hendryx
John Hiatt (Slug Line era)
Hipsway
James Honeyman-Scott
The Human League
Human Sexual Response

I

Icehouse
Ideal
Billy Idol
Idoli
Images in Vogue
Indochine
INXS

J

Joe Jackson
The Jam
Japan
±Billy Joel (Glass Houses era)
Johnny Hates Jazz
Matt Johnson
Grace Jones
Howard Jones
Joy Division

K

Kajagoogoo
KaS Product
Nik Kershaw
King
King Crimson (Discipline and Beat era)
The Knack
Kombi
Kora
Kult

L

Lady Pank
Laki Pingvini
Annabel Lamb
Robin Lane (early 1980s work)
Clive Langer
Peter Laughner
Cyndi Lauper
The League of Gentlemen
Thomas Leer
Level 42
Jona Lewie
Leyton Buzzards
Litfiba
The Little Girls
The Lotus Eaters
Lene Lovich
Nick Lowe
Luna

M

M
Madness
Martha and the Muffins
Moon Martin
Men at Work
Men Without Hats
The Method Actors
Hilly Michaels
Midnight Oil (early work)
Mi-Sex
Ministry (early work)
Missing Persons
Milan Mladenović
The MO
Models
Modern English
The Monochrome Set
The Motels
Mark Mothersbaugh

N

Naked Eyes
Nautilus Pompilius
The Neats
Nena
The Nerves
Nervus Rex
New Order
Nikki & The Corvettes
Nine Circles
Klaus Nomi
The Normal
Gary Numan
Terri Nunn
The Nuns

O

Hazel O'Connor
Oingo Boingo
One to One
Yoko Ono
Option 30
Orange Juice
Orchestral Manoeuvres in the Dark

P

P-Model
The Pale Fountains
Robert Palmer (Clues era)
Paraf
Graham Parker
Pearl Harbor and the Explosions
Pere Ubu
Perfect
Peter Perrett
Pet Shop Boys
The Photos
Plastic Bertrand
Plastics
Platinum Blonde
Pointed Sticks
±The Police
Polyrock
Pražský výběr
Prefab Sprout
±The Pretenders
Prljavo kazalište
The Psychedelic Furs
Pukka Orchestra
Pylon

R

Re-Flex
Real Life
Red Rockers
Republika
Rockpile
Romeo Void
±Linda Ronstadt (Mad Love era)
The Room
±Roxy Music
Darko Rundek

S

Šarlo Akrobata
Secret Service
Seona Dancing
The Sharks
Sigue Sigue Sputnik
The Sinceros
Single Bullet Theory
Siouxsie and the Banshees
Shandi Sinnamon
Skids
±Robert Smith
Sniff 'n' the Tears
The Soft Boys
Jimmy Somerville
The Sound
Spandau Ballet
The Specials
Ronnie Spector (Siren era)
Spider Murphy Gang
Spizzenergi
Spliff
Split Enz
Spoons
Squeeze
±Sting
La Strada
The Stranglers
Strawberry Switchblade
Jura Stublić
Johnny Štulić
Suburban Lawns
The Suburbs
±Donna Summer (1980s work)
The Swimming Pool Q's

T

Talk Talk
±Talking Heads
Taxi Girl
The Teardrop Explodes
Tears for Fears
The Telefones
Television Personalities
Termiti
Thompson Twins
'Til Tuesday
Tin Huey
Tom Tom Club
Tonio K
Toto Coelo
Toy Love
Translator
Izabela Trojanowska
Tubeway Army
Tuxedomoon

U

Ultravox
The Units
Urban Verbs

V

The Vapors
Videosex
Village People (Renaissance era)

W

The Waitresses
Wall of Voodoo
Wang Chung
When in Rome
Kim Wilde
The Wild Swans
Toyah Willcox
Gary Wilson

X
XTC

Y

Yachts
Yazoo

See also
List of post-punk bands
List of synthpop artists

References

Bibliography

New wave